Mónica Susana López de Zetzsche is an Argentine engineer.

Biography
Zetzsche studied Engineering at the University of Buenos Aires.

Since 1992 she presides López Castro SRL.

She has been President of YWCA (2003-2007).

References

University of Buenos Aires alumni
Argentine women engineers
21st-century women engineers
Argentine businesspeople
Living people
Year of birth missing (living people)